Jan Skopeček (born 21 October  1980) is a Czech Civic Democratic politician who has been a Member of the Chamber of Deputies (MP) since March 2017, and Deputy Speaker of the Chamber of Deputies since November 2021.

References

1980 births
Living people
People from Hořovice
Civic Democratic Party (Czech Republic) MPs
University of South Bohemia alumni
Prague University of Economics and Business alumni
Members of the Chamber of Deputies of the Czech Republic (2017–2021)
Members of the Chamber of Deputies of the Czech Republic (2013–2017)
Members of the Chamber of Deputies of the Czech Republic (2021–2025)